Lazy Lake is a village in Broward County, Florida, United States. The population was 33 at the 2020 census. Lazy Lake has no police department or fire department.

History

In 1946, real estate developer and contractor Hal Ratliff began the process of building the community around an old rock quarry (which later was filled with water and became the village's artificial lake.) He had the help of architect Clinton Gamble, who designed the original homes, and financier and accountant Charles H. Lindfors, who initially bought the land. Ratliff's goal was to build a community that was low-key, with heavy forestry infrastructure, allowing neighbors to keep to themselves and have some anonymity. Lazy Lake received its name when a friend of Hal Ratliff remarked that the lake looked "so lazy and peaceful."

When nearby Wilton Manors decided to incorporate as a city, it asked Lazy Lake's residents whether they wanted to be annexed to Wilton Manors. Lazy Lake's residents decided to incorporate themselves as the Village of Lazy Lake instead.

It is the smallest incorporated municipality in Broward County by area. This low population was because the town originally had been composed of single family homes in a small housing development, with a lake named Lazy Lake (its namesake) in the middle of the houses surrounding it. The village started with 13 homes on 13 acres (the maximum allowed by the charter.) The three homes of the three main founders of the village were the first to be built on the property, which was originally platted for a subdivision.

As of 1985, the village's annual budget was $7,000.

In 1995, residents agreed to place the entire village up for sale at $15 million, but nobody purchased it. It was on the market for two years, and Sue Carolyn Wise, their broker, went on television news stations and shows like CNN and A Current Affair to help promote the sale. People such as O. J. Simpson and a Kuwaiti prince were interested, but ultimately did not buy the village. After the two years of trying to be sold, Lazy Lake came off the market, and the village decided not to have the broker's contract renewed.

During 2008, a few residents on the village's north side wanted to disincorporate, secede and get annexed and incorporated into the city of Wilton Manors. The reason this small movement failed was because most residents on the south part of the village wanted to remain a village, which was due largely in part because the mayor and most council members at that time lived on the south side.

Geography

The village is a landlocked enclave surrounded entirely within the borders of the city of Wilton Manors.

Lazy Lane is the only road in the village.

Lazy Lake is surrounded by NE 24 Street to the north, NE 21 Court to the south, NE 1 Avenue to the east, and North Andrews Avenue to the west.

Demographics

2020 census

As of the 2020 United States census, there were 33 people, 8 households, and 1 family residing in the village.

2010 census

As of the 2010 census, there were 15 households, out of which 26.7% were vacant. In 2000, 41.7% had children under the age of 18 living with them, 41.7% were married couples living together, and 41.7% were non-families. 8.3% of all households were made up of individuals, and none had someone living alone who was 65 years of age or older. The average household size was 3.17 and the average family size was 3.14.

2000 census

In 2000, the village population was spread out, with 18.4% under the age of 18, 18.4% from 18 to 24, 26.3% from 25 to 44, 31.6% from 45 to 64, and 5.3% who were 65 years of age or older. The median age was 36 years. For every 100 females, there were 245.5 males. For every 100 females age 18 and over, there were 342.9 males.

In 2000, the median income for a household in the village was $142,581, and the median income for a family was $41,667. Males had a median income of $31,875 versus $31,250 for females. The per capita income for the village was $33,423. There were no families and 15.4% of the population living below the poverty line, including nobody under 18, and none of those over 64 years old.

As of 2000, speakers of English as a first language made up 100% of the population. It was the only municipality in all of Broward County that had no other languages spoken as their mother tongue.

Education

Broward County Public Schools operates public schools. Zoned schools are Wilton Manors Elementary, Sunrise Middle School, and Fort Lauderdale High School.

In addition the community is in the service area of the magnet school Pompano Beach High School.

References

External links 

 Official website

Villages in Broward County, Florida
Villages in Florida